Les Abymes is the most populous commune in the French overseas region and department of Guadeloupe, in the Lesser Antilles. It is located on the west side of the island of Grande-Terre, and is part of the largest metropolitan area of Guadeloupe, which also covers Pointe-à-Pitre.

The inhabitants of the commune are known as Abymiens or Abymiennes.

Geography
Les Abymes is located some 3 km north-east of Pointe-à-Pitre, 7 km east of Baie-Mahault, and 10 km south-west of Morne-à-l'Eau. Access to the commune is by Route nationale N1 from Baie-Mahault in the west which passes along the southern border of the commune and continues south as the N4. The N5 branches off the N1 and goes north-east through the centre of the commune and continues north-east to Morne-a-L'eau. The N11 branches off the N5 on the south-east of the town and continues north-west then west rejoining the N1. The D106 road also goes north from the commune to Vieux Bourg. The Route du Palais Royal passes north-east through the commune to join the N5. The Route de Chazeau branches from the Route du Palais Royal and goes north-east to Doubs.

Access to the Pointe-à-Pitre International Airport is from the N11.

Les Abymes is integrated into the urban area of Pointe-à-Pitre and, like the rest of the island, has a tropical climate.

Localities and hamlets

 Bauzon
 Baimbridge
 Bazin
 Beau-Soleil
 Besson
 Boisripeau
 Boisvin
 Boisvinière
 Boricaud
 Bouliqui
 Caduc
 Caraque
 Céligny
 Chauvel
 Chazeau
 Coma
 David
 Deravinières
 Doubs
 Dugazon
 Gaoza
 Grand-Camp
 Léonie
 Masselas
 Morne-Fleuri
 Nérée
 Papin
 Petit-Pérou
 Pointe-d'Or
 Quatre Chemins
 Le Raizet

Neighbouring communes and villages

Climate
Les Abymes has a tropical monsoon climate (Köppen climate classification Am).

History
The islands have been occupied since pre-Columbian times. Some remains have been found in the Dothémare area but the most remarkable were those found in Belle Plaine where surveys conducted by the Direction régionale des affaires culturelles (DRAC) in 2006 revealed the existence of a sizeable town dated from 1000 and 1200 AD (Troumassoid culture).

The first village, located a few kilometres from the current urban centre, was founded in 1691. It consisted of a few houses and experienced some development through the cultivation of sugar cane, cocoa, and coffee. A Parish Church was built in Les Abymes in 1726.

Administration
Les Abymes belongs to the community of communes called Cap Excellence which brings it together with Pointe-à-Pitre and Baie-Mahault. The commune is divided into three cantons:
 Canton of Les Abymes-1;
 Canton of Les Abymes-2;
 Canton of Les Abymes-3, which also includes part of Le Gosier.

List of Successive Mayors

Twinning

Les Abymes has twinning associations with:
  Boucherville (Canada) since 1988.
  Créteil (France)

Demography
In 2017 the commune had 53,491 inhabitants.

Economy
Most of the economic activity of Les Abymes is related to the presence of the Pointe-à-Pitre International Airport (formerly Aéroport du Raizet).  The airline Air Caraïbes has its headquarters in Les Abymes.

Although not a resort, Les Abymes is the second most important economic centre of Guadeloupe after the industrial zone of Jarry. The Milénis shopping centre is located in the commune. The "Family Plaza Complex" including a multiplex cinema, a shopping mall, and a leisure centre is due to open in 2015.

Facilities

Education
There are several educational institutions in the commune:

Public primary level:
 15 public preschools
 20 public primary schools
 2 public elementary schools

Public junior high schools:
 Collège du Bourg ;
 Collège du Raizet ;
 Collège Alexandre-Isaac ; (named after Alexandre Isaac, Senator)
 Collège Saint-John-Perse ;
 Collège Excellence-Sportive ;

Public sixth-form colleges/senior high schools:
 LGT Baimbridge
 Lycée Jardin-d'Essai - General sixth-form/high school and technological high school
 LGT Félix Proto
 LPO Chevalier de Saint-Georges

Private primary level:
 3 private primary schools
 1 private elementary school

Private secondary schools under contract:
 Lycée La Persévérance - private school for general and technological education
 Lycée Professionnel esthétique/coiffure

The Apprentice Training School for the Chamber of Crafts of Guadeloupe.

Former schools??
 Lycée Général Providence -  General sixth-form/high school and technological high school

A new building is under construction in the Dothémare-Providence ZAC scheduled for completion in the first quarter 2015.

Health
The University Hospital (CHU) of Pointe-à-Pitre / Les Abymes was the largest on the island in 2013 bringing together some 40 hospital services covering all medical fields with a total capacity of 862 beds with 319 doctors, 120 interns, and 3,000 hospital workers. The hospital is to be rebuilt at Perrin (commencing 2016 for delivery in 2019).

The Polyclinic of Guadeloupe is located at Morne Jolivière and is a private care centre with a total capacity of 110 beds including 20 beds for maternity.

Culture 
 The Sonis Cultural Centre
 The Renée Élie Hall at Chazeau 
 The Joseph Théodore Faustin Hall
 A Multiplex Cinema at the "Family Plaza Complex" (under construction, expected completion June 2015)
 The Félix-Proto Community Centre (under construction, expected completion end of 2015)

Culture and heritage

Civil heritage
The commune has a number of buildings and structures that are registered as historical monuments:
 A Revenue Office on Rue Frédéric (1932)
 The former Town Hall on Rue du Général Delacroix (1933)
 A Sepulchral Monument on Rue du Général Delacroix (1932)
 The Joseph Ricou Hospital on Rue de l'Hôpital (1931)
 The Market in the Place du Marché (1931)
 The War Memorial (1937)
 The Petrelluzzi House at Morne-Fleuri (20th century)
 The Mamiel Dwelling (19th century)

Other sites of interest
 The mangroves
 The Taonaba Mangrove House
 The Perrin and Belle Plaine Channel
 A Memorial from 1889 for the centenary of the French Revolution
 The Abymes, Land of convergence Monument at the entry to the town showing the location of different communities on the island.
 La Mulâtresse Solitude (1772–1802), a statue erected in 1999 in the Baimbridge district in memory of resistance against slavery, by the sculptor Jacky Poulier.
 A Statue of Nelson Mandela erected in 2014 at the Petit-Pérou roundabout in memory of the President of South Africa, by the sculptor Jean Moisa

Religious heritage

The commune has two religious buildings and structures that are registered as historical monuments:
 The Parish Church of the Immaculate Conception (1930)
 A Presbytery at Rue Schoelcher (1932)

Other religious sites of interest
 A Hindu Temple
 A Calvary

Sports 
Sports Facilities
 The Stade René Serge Nabajoth (capacity: 7,500 people)
 Inter-communal Swimming Pool at Dugazon 
 Tennis
 Golf (9 holes)
 The Centre of Sports Resources, expertise, and performance (CREPS) of Antilles Guyana is located in the commune, on an area of 9 hectares on the site of the old Darboussier stadium.

Sports Clubs
 Jeunesse Sportive Abymienne, football and Handball
 Le Siroco, football
 Jeunesse Evolution, football
 La Juventa, football
 la MJC Abymes, football, Basketball
 JCA (Jeunesse Cycliste des Abymes), cycling
 CSCA (Convergence Sportive Cycliste des Abymes), cycling
 VO2C (Vélo d'Or du Centre de la Caraïbe), cycling
 AS Police, cycling
 BRUC (Boisripeaux Rugby Club), rugby

Notable people linked to the commune
 Admiral T (born 1981), reggae-dancehall créole artiste
 Pegguy Arphexad (born 1973), former footballer for Liverpool F.C.
 Christine Arron (born 1973), athlete
 Lesly Bengaber (born 1979), French professional basketball player
 Blackartel (born 1974), artiste of reggae, ragga, and dancehall
 Nathalie Dechy (born 1979), tennis player
 Adrianna Lamalle (born 1982), athlete
 Gianni Mina (born 1992), tennis player
 Michel Morandais (born 1979), basketball player
 Thomas Phibel (born 1986), footballer
 Florent (born 1981), basketball player. Older brother of Mickael Pietrus
 Mickaël Piétrus (born 1982), former NBA player, 11th pick in the 2003 NBA Draft to the Golden State Warriors.
 Jacques Schwarz-Bart (born 1962), jazz saxophonist
 David Sommeil (born 1974), footballer
 Ronald Zubar (born 1985), footballer
 Philippe Guillard (born 1961), rugby player
 Ludovic Vaty (1988), basketball player
 Kery James (born 1977), rapper, producer, interpreter
 Pascal Chimbonda (born 1979), footballer
 Teddy Riner (born 1989), judoka
 Livio Nabab (born 1988), footballer at SM Caen
 Wilhem Belocian (born 1995), athlete
 Miguel Comminges, professional football player
 Karla Homolka aka Emily/Leanne Bordelais, convicted serial killer

See also
 Communes of the Guadeloupe department

External links

 Les Abymes official website 
 Guadeloupe General Council website 
 Pointe-à-Pitre International Airport (Aéroport Guadeloupe Pôle Caraïbes) 
 Les Abymes on Géoportail, National Geographic Institute (IGN) website

References

Communes of Guadeloupe